Caney Creek may refer to:

 Caney Creek (Arkansas) in the Ouachita National Forest
Caney Creek Wilderness, Arkansas
Caney Creek (Kentucky)
Pippa Passes, Kentucky, a city along the creek known to its inhabitants as "Caney Creek"
Caney Creek (Pine Creek tributary) in Ozark County, Missouri
Caney Creek (Scott County, Missouri)
Caney Creek (Oklahoma), located in Adair and Cherokee counties in Oklahoma
Caney Creek (Matagorda Bay) in Texas
Caney Creek (San Jacinto River tributary) in Texas